Belmonde Dogo is an Ivorian politician.

Dogo was the vice president of the National Assembly of the Ivory Coast from 2016 to 2019.

Since September 4, 2019, she has been the Secretary of State to the Minister of Women, Family and Children, in charge of the Empowerment of Women.

She was appointed Minister of Solidarity and the Fight against Poverty on April 6, 2021.

References

1975 births
Living people
Members of the National Assembly (Ivory Coast)
21st-century Ivorian women politicians
21st-century Ivorian politicians
Government ministers of Ivory Coast
Women government ministers of Ivory Coast